Xerocrassa claudiconus is a species of air-breathing land snail, a pulmonate gastropod mollusk in the family Geomitridae.

Distribution

This species is endemic to the islands of Gavdos and Gavdopoula in Greece.

See also
List of non-marine molluscs of Greece

References

claudiconus
Molluscs of Europe
Endemic fauna of Greece
Gastropods described in 1998